Daily Paper is an Amsterdam-based menswear and womenswear fashion brand established in 2012. Inspired by the African heritage of its founders, together with the passion for contemporary fashion, Daily Paper is known for its ready-to-wear garments and accessories.

Overview
The company was founded by three friends, Hussein Suleiman, Jefferson Osei and Abderrahmane Trabsini. In the beginning, the trio set up a blog whereby they occasionally sold T-shirts bearing their logo. The company subsequently grew and amplified into a major trendsetter. Although the blog was running in 2008, the company was founded in 2010 and established in 2012.

In 2015, they released a women's clothing parallel. They especially derived their design ideas from scenery in Somalia and other sub-Saharan African regions. In the same year, they branched out to diversify from casual wear to athletic and sportswear. In May 2015, they began releasing limited edition silhouette jackets.

References

External links

Clothing brands of the Netherlands
Companies based in Amsterdam